Sarazi or Sirazi (also spelled Siraji) is an Indo-Aryan language spoken in the Saraz region of the Jammu division of Jammu and Kashmir, India. It is native to the Saraz region, a hilly area taking up the northern half of Doda district and parts of neighbouring Ramban and Kishtwar districts.

Sarazi is spoken as a first language by  people (as of 2001), primarily Hindus, but it is also used as a lingua franca of the Saraz region and so is also spoken as a second language by Muslims, most of whom are native speakers of Kashmiri.

Sarazi has similarities both to Kashmiri, and to neighbouring Western Pahari languages like Bhaderwahi, though it is nowadays most often classified with the latter. Various local names for the language, which may represent distinct dialects, include Bhagwali, Deswali, and Korarwali.

Sarazi is not often used in writing, but when written, the default choice for a script falls on Perso-Arabic. The Latin script is also common, whereas Devanagari and the historical Takri script are encountered occasionally.

Classification
In the early 20th century, G.A. Grierson observed the similarities with both Kashmiri and with Western Pahari languages, and while noting that Sarazi can almost equally well be classified with either of the two, nonetheless opted to treat it as a dialect of Kashmiri on the basis of shared features in the verbal paradigm and elsewhere.

Although Sarazi is still sometimes perceived as a Kashmiri dialect, recent studies have generally placed it as a member of the Western Pahari group. This further corresponds with the speakers' own perceptions, who do not see their language as related to Kashmiri, and who consider themselves Pahari rather than Kashmiri.

An alternative proposal has seen the language as intermediate between the two groups but independent of either. It has also been conjectured that the language could have originally arisen as a creole.

Notable events

A daily news headlines program is broadcast by a news outlet The Chenab Times in Sarazi and Bhaderwahi languages to promote them.

References

Bibliography

 

Indo-Aryan languages
Languages of Jammu and Kashmir
Endangered languages of India